Cücanlı (also, Jujanly, Cügənli) is a village in the municipality of Isaly in the Gadabay District of Azerbaijan.

References

Populated places in Gadabay District